Cancer johngarthi is a species of crab that lives in the eastern Pacific Ocean from Mexico to Panama. It was separated from C. porteri in 1989, and is the subject of a small-scale fishery off Baja California.

Distribution
C. johngarthi lives along the Pacific coast of Mexico and Central America, from 29°N at Isla Guadalupe to 7°N in Panama, including southern parts of the Gulf of California (Sea of Cortez).

Description and taxonomic history
C. johngarthi was only recognised as a separate species in 1989, its members having previously been treated under C. porteri. The specific epithet commemorates John Shrader Garth of the University of Southern California; Garth had recorded "C. porteri" from Sinaloa, Mexico, in 1961. It differs from C. porteri chiefly in the "paper shell" texture of the carapace. C. johngarthi also has longer legs and stouter claws, although the differences in claws are not clear in juveniles, due to differences in allometry.

Fishery
In 2004, the government of Mexico approved a trial fishery for C. johngarthi off the Baja California peninsula, initially restricted to two fishing vessels, with only one of the two actually engaging in fishing for C. johngarthi. The catch per unit effort decreases the longer the traps are left in place, and the majority of the crabs caught in the traps was male.

References

Further reading

Cancroidea
Edible crustaceans
Crustaceans of the eastern Pacific Ocean
Arthropods of Mexico
Arthropods of Central America
Crustaceans described in 1989
Tropical Eastern Pacific